Goh Jin Wei (born 30 January 2000) is a Malaysian badminton player. She won the 2015 and 2018 BWF World Junior Championships and the girls' singles title at the 2018 Youth Olympics. At senior level, she won the women's singles title at the 2017 Southeast Asian Games.

Early life 
Goh Jin Wei was born in Bukit Mertajam, Penang into a Malaysian Chinese family, to Loh Bee Sim and Goh Boon Huat. She first started playing badminton at the age of six as a hobby. Her father noticed her talent and let her train under the guidance of Teh Peng Huat, Lee Chong Wei's former coach. When she was 11, she won the Under-12 Grand Prix Finals and the Malaysian School Sports Council representing her primary school, SJKC Jit Sin ‘B’. She was drafted into the Malaysia national team at the age of 14.

Career

Junior level 

At the 2015 World Junior Championships, Goh won the girls singles' event by defeating compatriot Lee Ying Ying in the final. In 2017, she earned a bronze medal in the singles event after losing to Han Yue in the semifinals. Goh participated at the Youth Olympic Games in Buenos Aires where she defeated top seed, Phittayaporn Chaiwan in the semifinals. In the final, Goh defeated Wang Zhiyi to win Malaysia's first gold medal at the Youth Olympic Games. In doing so, Goh became the first ever shuttler to win both World Junior Championships and the Youth Olympic Games title. At the 2018 World Junior Championships, Goh reached the final where she defeated Line Christophersen to capture her second World Junior Championship title.

2015–2020 
In February 2015, Goh became the youngest-ever national winner at the age of 15 after defeating Lim Yin Fun in the final of the Kuala Lumpur Open. At the 2015 Southeast Asian Games, Goh won the bronze medal in women's singles event and a silver medal in women's team event. She won her first senior title, the Belgian International at the age of 15 by defeating Kirsty Gilmour in the final. She won her second senior title at the Vietnam International.

In April 2016, she won the Orleans International. Goh was named in the Malaysian squad for the 2016 Uber Cup. She made her Super Series debut at the 2016 Australian Open where she defeated Michelle Li in the first round before losing to eventual champion, Saina Nehwal in the second round. In her first Grand Prix Gold tournament, Goh reached the final of the Indonesian Masters before losing to top seed, Busanan Ongbamrungphan. She then lost in the semifinals of the Thailand Open to the same opponent. In December 2016, she became national No. 1 shuttler for the first time in her career after surpassing Tee Jing Yi in BWF Ranking.

In January 2017, Goh competed at the Malaysian Masters where she lost to Lee Chia-hsin in the second round after playing with an injury. She made her return at the Malaysia Open in April and was defeated in the second round by Chen Yufei. In July 2017, she reached the final of the Chinese Taipei Open where she lost to Saena Kawakami. At the 2017 SEA Games in August, Goh won all her matches in the women's team event. The team made it to the finals where they lost to Thailand, taking home the silver medal. In the women's singles event, Goh defeated her compatriot and senior, Soniia Cheah in the final, becoming the first Malaysian to win the women's singles gold medal since Wong Mew Choo in 2003. In September 2017, Goh reached the final of the Singapore International which she lost to Ruselli Hartawan.

In March 2018, she competed in her first All England Open but lost to Aya Ohori in the second round. In June 2018, she reached the quarterfinals of the Malaysia Open before losing to eventual winner, Tai Tzu-ying. In her World Championships debut, she lost to the reigning world champion, Nozomi Okuhara in the third round. At the Korea Masters in November, Goh lost in the semifinals to Li Xuerui.

In January 2019, Goh beat Akane Yamaguchi, Zhang Yiman and He Bingjiao to reached the semifinals of 2019 Malaysia Masters before losing to eventual winner, Ratchanok Intanon. At the 2019 German Open, Goh reached the semifinals where she lost to Akane Yamaguchi. Goh would later suffer from a stomach ailment and she played her last BWF tournament in 2019 at the Australian Open where she lost to Soniia Cheah in the first round. In October, she underwent surgery due to the ailment. She made her return at the 2020 Thailand Masters, losing to Akane Yamaguchi in the first round. Goh was included in the Malaysia's 2020 Badminton Asia Team Championships squad which would be her final BWF tournament in 2020.

2021–present: Retirement and return to badminton 
In March 2021, Goh reached the quarterfinals of Orléans Masters. In June, Goh competed at the Spanish International, reaching the final before losing to Kisona Selvaduray. In September 2021, Goh announced her retirement from professional badminton in a YouTube video, citing health reasons after her colectomy surgery back in 2019. However, Goh returned to professional badminton after signing a three-year contract with Kuala Lumpur Racquet Club as an independent player on 6 January 2022 while reiterating that she would not be able to give her full commitment as a player with the national team due to her health issues. She was due to appear in the 2022 Syed Modi International and 2022 Odisha Open after having registered for the tournaments, but was asked to withdraw by the Badminton Association of Malaysia (BAM). On 21 January 2022, BAM issued her a backdated two-year ban from participating in Badminton World Federation-sanctioned tournaments, starting from when she left the national team in September 2021. The ban was issued to her and Lee Zii Jia after the latter quit the national team on 19 January 2022.  On 27 January 2022, after submitting her appeal to BAM, the ban was rescinded.

The 2022 Korea Open was Goh's first tournament after the rescinding of her ban where she was eliminated in the quarterfinals by Kim Ga-eun. In October 2022, she reached her first BWF World Tour final and finished as runner-up at the 2022 Vietnam Open Super 100 tournament.

Achievements

Southeast Asian Games 
Women's singles

Youth Olympic Games 
Girls' singles

World Junior Championships 
Girls' singles

BWF World Tour (1 runner-up) 
The BWF World Tour, which was announced on 19 March 2017 and implemented in 2018, is a series of elite badminton tournaments sanctioned by the Badminton World Federation (BWF). The BWF World Tour is divided into levels of World Tour Finals, Super 1000, Super 750, Super 500, Super 300, and the BWF Tour Super 100.

Women's singles

BWF Grand Prix (2 runners-up) 
The BWF Grand Prix had two levels, the Grand Prix and Grand Prix Gold. It was a series of badminton tournaments sanctioned by the Badminton World Federation (BWF) and played between 2007 and 2017.

Women's singles

  BWF Grand Prix Gold tournament

BWF International Challenge/Series (3 titles, 2 runners-up) 
Women's singles

  BWF International Challenge tournament
  BWF International Series tournament

BWF Junior International (2 titles) 
Girls' singles

Mixed doubles

  BWF Junior International Grand Prix tournament
  BWF Junior International Challenge tournament
  BWF Junior International Series tournament
  BWF Junior Future Series tournament

Awards and accolades

References

External links 
 

2000 births
Living people
Sportspeople from Penang
Malaysian sportspeople of Chinese descent
Malaysian female badminton players
Badminton players at the 2018 Summer Youth Olympics
Youth Olympic gold medalists for Malaysia
Badminton players at the 2022 Commonwealth Games
Commonwealth Games gold medallists for Malaysia
Commonwealth Games medallists in badminton
Competitors at the 2015 Southeast Asian Games
Competitors at the 2017 Southeast Asian Games
Southeast Asian Games gold medalists for Malaysia
Southeast Asian Games silver medalists for Malaysia
Southeast Asian Games bronze medalists for Malaysia
Southeast Asian Games medalists in badminton
21st-century Malaysian women
Medallists at the 2022 Commonwealth Games